Julio César Arana del Águila, (1864–1952) was a Peruvian entrepreneur and politician. A major figure in the rubber industry in the upper Amazon basin, he is probably best known in the English-speaking world through 's 1909 articles in the British magazine Truth, accusing him of practices that amounted to a terroristic reign of slavery over the natives of the region. A company of which he was the general manager, the Peruvian Amazon Company, was investigated by a commission in 1910 on which Roger Casement served. He was appointed its liquidator in September 1911. He later blamed the downfall of the company on the British directors for neglecting to manage the Peruvian staff, of whom he was chief.

Arana became a senator for the Department of Loreto from 1922–26 and, as a result of the Salomon-Lozano Treaty, signed in Lima in 1927, Peru transferred his properties in the Putumayo to Colombia. He died at age 88, penniless, in a small house in Magdalena del Mar, near Lima.

References

Externa link 

1864 births
1952 deaths